Vikranta yadav9696

(born 14 December 1982) is an Indian first-class cricketer who represented Rajasthan. He made his first-class debut for Rajasthan in the 2006-07 Ranji Trophy on 9 December 2006.

References

External links
 

1982 births
Living people
Indian cricketers
Rajasthan cricketers